Cotie McMahon is a basketball player for the Ohio State Buckeyes. McMahon was named Big Ten Women's Basketball Freshman of the Year in 2023.

Basketball career 
McMahon attended Centerville High School in Centerville, OH. She was ranked 23 in the 2022 high school recruiting class. McMahon won a gold medal with team USA in the 2022 FIBA Americas U18 Championship. She averaged 14.2 points, 7.5 rebounds, and 3.2 assists in the tournament.

In her freshman year, McMahon won Big Ten Player of the Week. She was named Big Ten Freshman of the Week four times. At the conclusion of the regular season, McMahon was named to the all-conference second team. McMahon plays forward. As a college player, McMahon has earned money with her name, image, likeness rights.

References 

American women's basketball players
Living people
Ohio State Buckeyes women's basketball players